The 40th Primetime Emmy Awards were held on Sunday, August 28, 1988. The ceremony was broadcast on Fox from the Pasadena Civic Auditorium in Pasadena, California. The ceremony was pushed back from its newly established September date because of the 1988 Summer Olympics in Seoul, South Korea. Cable stations HBO and Showtime received their first major nominations at this ceremony.

Despite a season that consisted of only six episodes, newcomer series The Wonder Years won Outstanding Comedy Series. After winning his fourth consecutive Primetime Emmy Award for Outstanding Supporting Actor in a Comedy Series, John Larroquette requested to have his name taken off of the ballot for future ceremonies. Frank's Place became the most recent show whose only season was nominated for Outstanding Comedy/Drama Series.

In the drama field L.A. Law came into the ceremony as the defending champ and with 15 major nominations, (second most ever by a drama series at that time), it was seen as the heavy favorite. However, it was upset by another first season show, thirtysomething which won four major awards on the night including Outstanding Drama Series, L.A. Law only won one major award. The duo of Cagney & Lacey won Outstanding Lead Actress in a Drama Series for the sixth consecutive year, this tied The Mary Tyler Moore Shows record for acting categories, which still stands, (it stood for all categories until The Daily Show with Jon Stewart won ten consecutive Primetime Emmy Awards for Outstanding Variety, Music, or Comedy Series). With the wins for Bea Arthur and Estelle Getty, The Golden Girls became the most recent show to have all of its cast members win Emmys. It became the second series to do so, following All in the Family. Three other programs would accomplish this feat: Will & Grace in 2003, The Simpsons in 2014, and Schitt's Creek in 2020.

There was controversy during the nomination process regarding the PBS series Rumpole of the Bailey. The series was initially placed in the miniseries field, but soon after the Academy disqualified it and placed it in the drama series field. Its slot in the miniseries category was filled by The Bourne Identity.

Winners and nominees

Programs

Acting

Lead performances

Supporting performances

Guest performances

Directing

Writing

Most major nominations
By network 
 NBC – 69
 CBS – 32
 ABC – 24

By program
 L.A. Law (NBC) – 15
 Cheers (NBC) – 9
 The Golden Girls (NBC) / St. Elsewhere (NBC) – 8
 Baby M (ABC) / thirtysomething (ABC) – 6

Most major awards
By network 
 NBC – 11
 ABC – 8
 CBS – 6

By program
 thirtysomething (ABC) – 4
 Frank's Place (CBS) / The Golden Girls (NBC) / Inherit the Wind (NBC) – 2

Notes

References

External links
 Emmys.com list of 1988 Nominees & Winners
 

040
1988 television awards
1988 in American television
1988 in California
August 1988 events in the United States